Karatobe is a district of West Kazakhstan Region in western Kazakhstan. The administrative center of the district is the selo of Karatobe. Population:

Geography
Karatobe District lies at the northern edge of the Caspian Depression. The Buldyrty and Kaldygaity rivers flow across the territory of the district.

References 

Districts of Kazakhstan
West Kazakhstan Region